North Linthicum station is a Baltimore Light Rail station in Linthicum Heights, Maryland. There are currently 347 free parking spaces at this station. No bus connections can be made from here.

This station is the penultimate station on the light rail's trunk line that is shared by trains of both the Hunt Valley – BWI Marshall line and the Hunt Valley – Cromwell line. Both lines depart onto branches to BWI Marshall Airport station and Glen Burnie station south of the Linthicum station.

Station layout

References

External links
Schedules
Boulevard Place entrance from Google Maps Street View

Baltimore Light Rail stations
Linthicum, Maryland
Railway stations in Anne Arundel County, Maryland
Railway stations in the United States opened in 1887
Railway stations in the United States opened in 1993